Arthur Franklin Walker (born 9 September 1941) is a retired American triple jumper, who participated at the Olympic Games in Mexico 1968 and Munich 1972.

He was the best American triple jumper in the end of the 1960s, won four consecutive Mt. San Antonio College titles (from 1965 to 1968), three national titles (1965, 1966, and 1968), and one indoor national title in 1967.

He took part at the 1965 Summer Universiade in Budapest, ending at 5th place.

Art Walker improved for three times the US record of triple jump, increasing it by more than one foot compared to the previous record.  After winning three national championships, he lost by a whisker the bronze medal in the exciting triple jump event at 1968 Olympics in Mexico City, where despite a jump of  - up to two days before the world record stood to  - he ended only at the fourth place, behind the Italian jumper Giuseppe Gentile.

He took part also at the 1972 Summer Olympics in Munich, ending at 29th place.

References

External links

1941 births
Living people
American male triple jumpers
Athletes (track and field) at the 1968 Summer Olympics
Athletes (track and field) at the 1972 Summer Olympics
Olympic track and field athletes of the United States
Track and field athletes from Georgia (U.S. state)